Oblate Father refers to an Oblate who is a priest, notably as a member of one of the following Catholic orders:
Missionary Oblates of Mary Immaculate
Oblate Fathers of St. Francis of Sales